was a town located in Sōma District, Fukushima Prefecture, Japan.

As of 2003, the town had an estimated population of 12,341 and a density of 114.21 persons per km2. The total area was 108.06 km2.

On January 1, 2006, Kashima, along with the city of Haramachi, and the town of Odaka (also from Sōma District), was merged to create the city of Minamisōma.

Points of interest
 Michinoku Mano-Manyo Botanical Garden

Dissolved municipalities of Fukushima Prefecture